Cristóbal Mosquera de Figueroa (1547–1610) was a Spanish poet and writer. He was corregidor of Utrera, El Puerto de Santa María and Écija.

Spanish male writers
1547 births
1610 deaths